Ord's thyroiditis is a common form of thyroiditis, an autoimmune disease where the body's own antibodies fight the cells of the thyroid.

It is named after the physician, William Miller Ord, who first described it in 1877 and again in 1888. It is more common among women than men. It has historically been separated from Hashimoto's Thyroiditis which presents with goiters, however some argue they each represent extremes of the same disease and should be classified together as a combined "Ord-Hashimoto’s disease".

Signs and symptoms
Symptoms of Ord's thyroiditis include symptoms of hypothyroidism and atrophy of the thyroid gland.

Pathophysiology
Physiologically, antibodies to thyroid peroxidase and/or thyroglobulin cause gradual destruction of follicles in the thyroid gland.  Accordingly, the disease can be detected clinically by looking for these antibodies in the blood. It is also characterised by invasion of the thyroid tissue by leukocytes, chiefly T-lymphocytes.

Ord's thyroiditis usually results in hypothyroidism. Transient hyperthyroid states in the acute phase, (a common observation in Hashimoto's thyroiditis), are rare in Ord's disease.

Diagnosis

Treatment
Treatment is as with hypothyroidism, daily thyroxine(T4) and/or triiodothyronine(T3).

Epidemiology
Outside Europe a goitrous form of autoimmune thyroiditis (Hashimoto's Thyroiditis) is more common than Ord's disease.

See also
 Thyroiditis
 Hypothyroidism
 Hashimoto's thyroiditis

References

 Davies, T. F. (2003), Ord-Hashimoto's Disease: Renaming a Common Disorder - Again. Thyroid 13 (4) 317. .
 Williams D. (2003), Hashimoto's and Ord's diseases. Thyroid. 13(12): 1189.

External links 

Autoimmune diseases
Thyroid disease

de:Ord-Thyreoiditis